The sixth season of Desperate Housewives, a television series created by Marc Cherry, began airing on September 27, 2009, and concluded on May 16, 2010. The season consists of 23 episodes. The deceased Mary Alice Young continues to narrate the events in the lives of her friends and Wisteria Lane residents, Susan Delfino, Lynette Scavo, Bree Hodge, Gabrielle Solis and Katherine Mayfair. Angie Bolen and her family are the focus of this season's mystery.

The sixth season of Desperate Housewives began on RTÉ Two in the Republic of Ireland on Tuesday, January 5, 2010. The sixth season also started airing at 10:00pm on Channel 4 in the United Kingdom on January 27, 2010, as well as on the Seven Network in Australia on February 1, 2010. It started airing at 9:00pm on February 1, 2010, on OSN's Show Series in the Middle East. It also started airing in India on Star World from February 26, 2010, at 10pm. In France, Season 6 began airing in the translated version on April 1, 2010 on Canal +.

The series saw lower ratings in the sixth season. In the first 12 episodes, the series attracted very similar viewership to the second half of the fifth season; however, the ratings declined heavily after the thirteenth episode, "How About a Friendly Shrink?", due to the competition with the 67th Golden Globe Awards. The series continued to lower numbers, with further competitions like the 2010 Grammy Awards, 2010 Winter Olympics, and the new CBS reality series Undercover Boss, which first aired after the Super Bowl XLIV, pulling impressive ratings. Desperate Housewives lost much steam in the second half of its season, picking up some again in the final three episodes.

Nonetheless, the show got a spot in the twenty most watched series in the 2009–2010 television season, at number twenty, averaging 12.82 million viewers (tenth, in scripted shows). When adding DVR figures, the show ranked at thirteenth place (seventh, among scripted shows) with 14.13 million viewers. The sixth season ranked fourteenth in the important, advertiser-coveted 18–49 age group, with a 4.2 rating, sixth highest with scripted shows. After including DVR playback (Live+7 days), the season average number increased to a 5.0 rating, placing eighth, in terms of scripted shows.

Production
The first episode of the sixth season, "Nice is Different Than Good", began airing on September 27, 2009. The series creator, Marc Cherry, told Entertainment Weekly that the bride's initial identity was to be Katherine and that Susan was the one who was going to have a nervous breakdown, until viewers informed him that they would rather see Susan and Mike reconcile. Cherry explained: "I originally was going to have Mike marry Katherine, but as I went out into the world on vacation and just started talking to people they were so determined that Mike and Susan should get together; they were so insistent on it. So I started to think, 'What if I went that way?' And it occurred to me that it might be a more effective way to go as opposed to frustrating the fans for another year by keeping Mike and Susan apart. The fans demanded it in a voice so loud I was kind of scared to go against them". Cherry also hinted that the couple's marriage "plays better for this season's mystery". Cherry also said that Katherine will suffer a breakdown, adding: "And it's going to be one of the funniest breakdowns you've ever seen". Marc Cherry revealed that the sixth season mystery will pay homage to a classic Dallas storyline. He added: "What we've planned is an interesting mystery storyline involving one of our beloved characters. It's a 'Who shot J.R.?' kind of storyline. For the mid-season cliffhanger, Marc Cherry has revealed that there will be a plane crash in season six of Desperate Housewives. The show's creator explained that the story is still in the planning stages and added that he does not yet know who will be involved in the accident. "It's going to be my cliffhanger for the first half of the season," he said, adding that it would "affect everyone's lives". However, Cherry said that none of the main characters will be killed in the crash. "I'd love to kill somebody 'cause that's just what I do," he joked. "But the truth is, right now I don't have anyone major dying."

Cast

The sixth season had twelve roles receiving star billing, with ten out of thirteen returning from the previous season. The series is narrated by Brenda Strong, who portrays the deceased Mary Alice Young, as she observes from beyond the grave the lives of the Wisteria Lane residents and her former best friends. Teri Hatcher portrayed Susan Mayer, who is married to Mike again. Felicity Huffman portrayed Lynette Scavo, who is trying to conceal her pregnancy in order to keep her job. Marcia Cross portrayed Bree Hodge, who is having an affair with her divorce lawyer. Eva Longoria portrayed Gabrielle Solis, who now deals with her teenage niece. Ricardo Antonio Chavira portrayed Carlos Solis, Gabrielle's husband and Lynette's new boss. Doug Savant portrayed Tom Scavo, Lynette's husband who returns to college. Kyle MacLachlan portrayed Orson Hodge, who suffers a terrible accident while trying to save his marriage to Bree. Dana Delaney portrayed Katherine Mayfair, who endures a mental breakdown after Mike leaves her to remarry Susan. James Denton portrayed Mike Delfino, Susan's husband who deals with his ex-girlfriend and with a financial crisis. New additions to the main cast included Drea de Matteo playing Angie Bolen, whose mysterious arc is the season's main storyline, and Maiara Walsh in the role of Ana Solis, Carlos's rebellious niece who moved to Wisteria Lane in the fifth season finale. Shawn Pyfrom did not return as a regular; he instead made guest appearances as Andrew Van de Kamp, Bree's gay son. 

The "also starring" cast had many changes. Andrea Bowen re-joined the cast as Julie Mayer, Susan's daughter and victim of the Fairview strangler. Long-time supporting actress Kathryn Joosten was promoted to also starring as elderly neighbor Karen McCluskey. Jeffrey Nordling and Beau Mirchoff appeared as Nick and Danny Bolen, respectively Angie's husband and son. Charlie Carver (Porter Scavo), Joshua Logan Moore (Parker Scavo) and Kendall Applegate (Penny Scavo) all remained, while Max Carver left the also starring cast, as his character Preston Scavo has left for Europe, but made guest appearances in the season. Additionally, child actors Madison De La Garza (Juanita Solis) and Mason Vale Cotton (M.J. Delfino) were promoted from co-stars to also starring.

This season featured many established and new guest stars. Tuc Watkins and Kevin Rahm respectively played Bob Hunter and Lee McDermott, a gay couple and residents of Wisteria Lane. Part of Bree's storyline were Richard Burgi portraying Karl Mayer, Susan's ex-husband and Bree's divorce lawyer and new lover, Dakin Matthews returning as Reverend Sykes, reverend at the local Presbyterian church, Samuel Page appearing as Sam Allen, Rex's son conceived before he meets Bree, and Joy Lauren in the role of Danielle Katz, Bree's daughter. Part of Gabrielle's storyline were Daniella Baltodano playing Celia Solis, Gabrielle's youngest daughter, Jesse Metcalfe returning as John Rowland, Gabrielle's ex-lover and former gardener, Jeff Doucette portraying Father Crowley, priest at the local Catholic church, and John Rubinstein appearing as Principal Hobson, headmaster at Juanita and M.J.'s school. Part of Lynette's storyline were Helena Mattsson in the role of Irina Korsakov, Preston's Russian fiancée, and Brent Kinsman, Shane Kinsman and Zane Huett returning as the younger versions of Preston, Porter and Parker Scavo in flashbacks. Part of Katherine's storyline were Lyndsy Fonseca who returned for one episode in the role of Dylan Mayfair, Katherine's daughter, and Julie Benz portraying Robin Gallagher, a stripper and Katherine's new love interest. Part of the main mystery arc were John Barrowman appearing as Patrick Logan, an eco-terrorist and Danny's biological father, Julie McNiven playing Emily Portsmith, a barrista at a local cafe and acquaintance of Nick, and Ellen Crawford portraying Iris Beckley, a neighbor of Angie's mother that informs Patrick of the Bolens' whereabouts. Orson Bean was introduced in the role of Roy Bender, Mrs. McCluskey's new boyfriend. Josh Zuckerman appeared as Eddie Orlofsky, the infamous Fairview strangler. Maria Cominis played Mona Clarke, a Wisteria Lane resident who blackmails Angie when she discovers her secret. Mindy Sterling portrayed Mitzi Kinsky, a new neighbor in Wisteria Lane. Furthermore, Mark Moses returned in the season finale as Paul Young, Mary Alice's widower.

Episodes

International ratings

Detailed international schedules and ratings

United States (ABC)

Republic of Ireland (RTÉ 2)
 Desperate Housewives airs Tuesdays at 9:55pm on RTÉ 2 in Ireland.
 All ratings below are supplied from the RTÉ Guide TV guide. The ratings are supplied by TAM Ireland/Nielsen TAM.
 Season 6 averaged 451,000 viewers when the average was calculated after the season finale.

India (Star World)

United Kingdom (Channel 4)

New Zealand (TV2)
All sourced from: Throng Ratings.
The season averaged 431,975 viewers.

 For episode 134, original airing only / original including prime-time repeat special before beginning of new season on January 7, 2011.

DVD release

References

External links 
 

 
2009 American television seasons
2010 American television seasons
Eco-terrorism in fiction